Princess Maria Feodorovna Pozharskaya (died 1607), was a Tsardom of Russian lady-in-waiting, a royal favorite of tsarina Maria Skuratova-Belskaya.

She married prince Michail Fedorovich Pozharsky in 1571, and became the mother of Dmitry Pozharsky. As a member of the elite nobility, she was appointed lady-in-waiting to the tsar's daughter Xenia Borisovna of Russia, but advanced to be lady-in-waiting to the tsarina, Maria Skuratova-Belskaya. She defeated her rivals Maria Lykova (married to Michael Lykov), and became a favorite of the tsarina. She was the highest ranking lady-in-waiting of the tsarina during the reign of Godunov, and had a great deal of influence.

After the reign of Godunov, she retired from court to a convent and became a nun by the name Evdokia.

References
  В—в Н. Пожарская, Мария (Евфросиния) Феодоровна // Русский биографический словарь : в 25 томах. — СПб.—М., 1896—1918.

1607 deaths
Tsardom of Russia ladies-in-waiting
Tsardom of Russia nuns
17th-century Russian women